= Junior (education year) =

Year of study in the US and some other countries

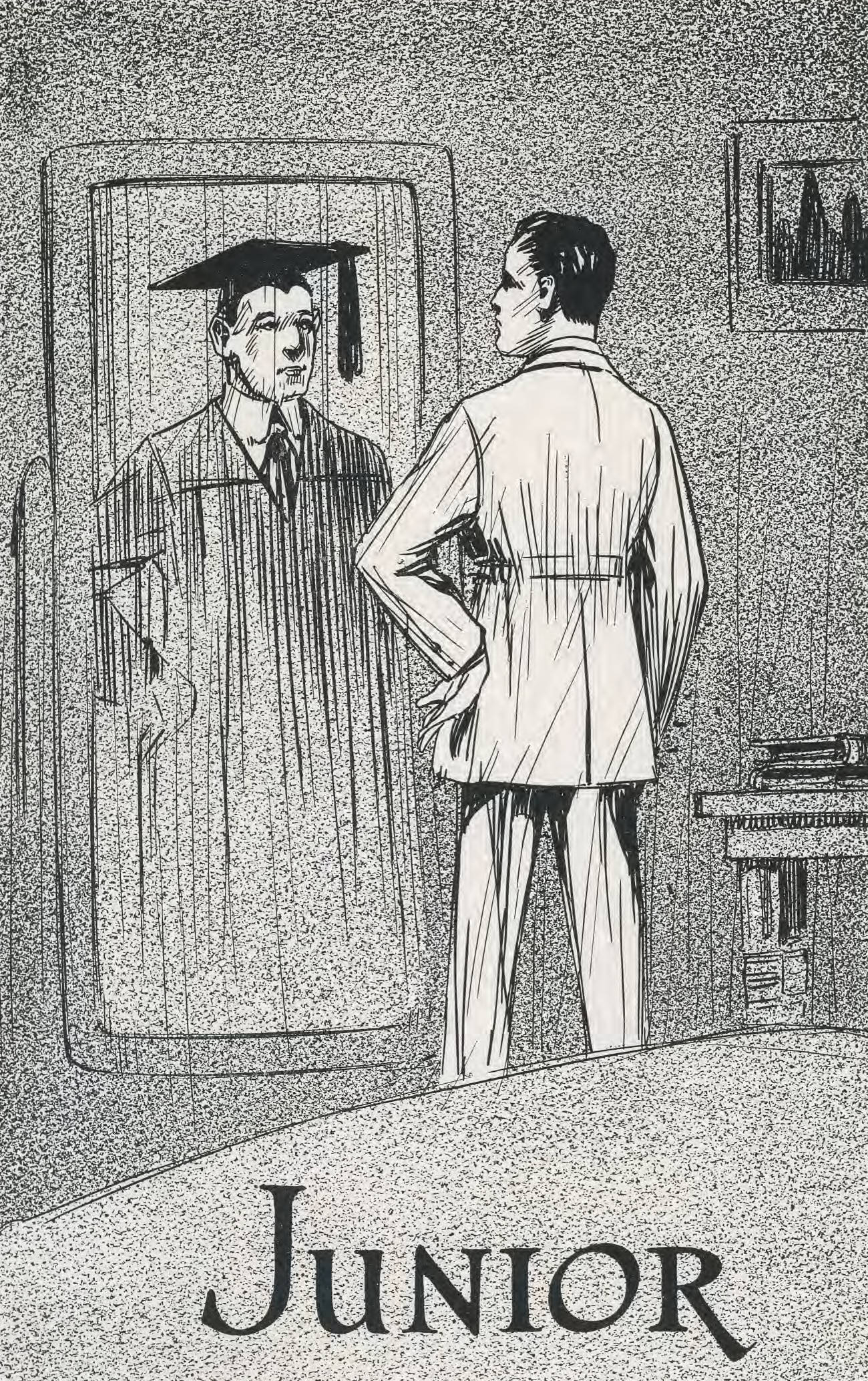
Junior class artwork, from East Texas State Normal College's 1920 Locust yearbook

A junior is a person in the third year at an educational institution in the US and some other countries, usually at a secondary school or at the college and university level, but also in other forms of post-secondary educational institutions or primary schools. In United States high schools, a junior is an eleventh-grade student; juniors are considered upperclassmen.

== Education in the United States ==
=== High school ===
In the United States, the 11th grade is usually the third year of a student's high school period and is referred to as junior year. High school juniors are advised to prepare for college entrance exams (ACT or SAT) and to start narrowing the list of colleges / universities they want to attend. A common assumption is that colleges and universities place greater emphasis on the junior year when making admissions decisions, as the last complete academic year before the college admissions process.

=== College ===
In the U.S., colleges generally require students to declare an academic major by the beginning of their junior year. College juniors are advised to find internships in their chosen field and to begin considering additional education (medical school, law school, etc.) and preparing for relevant licensure examinations.

== See also ==
- Freshman
- Sophomore
- Senior
